John Stack (22 March 1924 – 28 May 1997) was an American x-ray engineer, competition rower and Olympic champion, born in Camden, New Jersey. He won a gold medal in coxed eights at the 1948 Summer Olympics with the American team.

References

1924 births
1997 deaths
Sportspeople from Camden, New Jersey
American male rowers
Rowers at the 1948 Summer Olympics
Olympic gold medalists for the United States in rowing
Medalists at the 1948 Summer Olympics